The GLAAD Excellence in Media Award is a special GLAAD Media Award presented annually by the Gay & Lesbian Alliance Against Defamation at the GLAAD Media Awards ceremony held in New York City. It is presented to public figures in media and entertainment who, through their work, have increased the visibility and understanding of the LGBT community. In 2023, it was named in honor of Barbara Gittings.

List of recipients
 1996 – Barbara Walters
 1998 – Bob Weinstein, Harvey Weinstein
 2001 – Vanessa Redgrave
 2002 – Glenn Close
 2003 – Diane Sawyer
 2004 – Julianne Moore
 2005 – Billy Crystal
 2006 – Amanda McKeon
 2007 – Patti LaBelle
 2008 – Judy Shepard
 2009 – Tyra Banks
 2010 – Joy Behar
 2011 – Russell Simmons
 2015 – Kelly Ripa
 2016 – Robert De Niro
 2017 – Debra Messing
 2018 – Ava DuVernay
 2022 – Judith Light
 2023 – Los Angeles Blade and Washington Blade

References

External links
 Official GLAAD Media Awards website

Excellence in Media Award
Lists of LGBT-related award winners and nominees